Valtteri Karnaranta (born 19 September 2002) is a Finnish ice hockey player who currently plays for Porin Ässät of the Liiga. He made his Liiga debut on 17 September 2021 in a game against HPK.

References 

Living people
2002 births
Ässät players
Finnish ice hockey left wingers
Sportspeople from Oulu